The Pelletier House is a historic home and national historic district located at Jacksonville, Onslow County, North Carolina.  Built in the 1850s by Rufus Ferrand Pelletier in the Greek Revival style, it sits atop Wantland Spring on the banks of the New River. Initially constructed as a one-room dwelling to serve as home and office, additional rooms were built onto the structure during later years. The house itself was originally part of a turpentine lot owned by Rufus Pelletier and his brother William Pelletier. These rooms were damaged during a fire in the early 1950s. The house was occupied by Pelletier's daughter Eliza until her death in 1954.  Subsequently, the Onslow Historical Society acquired and maintained the structure until January 25, 2013, when Onslow County took over ownership. The house is opened for public viewings on special occasions. It is the oldest standing structure in Jacksonville.

Pelletier House was listed on the National Register of Historic Places on November 13, 1989.

Notes

External links

Information and Photos from NC ECHO
Article concerning transfer of ownership

Museums in Onslow County, North Carolina
Jacksonville, North Carolina
Houses on the National Register of Historic Places in North Carolina
Historic districts on the National Register of Historic Places in North Carolina
Historic house museums in North Carolina
Greek Revival houses in North Carolina
Houses in Onslow County, North Carolina
National Register of Historic Places in Onslow County, North Carolina